Ezio Cecchi (11 May 1913 – 19 August 1984) was an Italian professional cyclist. Cecchi twice finished second overall in the Giro d'Italia. He finished second in 1938 to Giovanni Valetti. In 1948 Cecchi finished eleven seconds behind the winner Fiorenzo Magni; this margin of victory is still the slimmest margin of victory in the history of the Giro d'Italia.

References

Italian male cyclists
1913 births
1984 deaths
Sportspeople from the Province of Chieti
Cyclists from Abruzzo